Asian Educational Services (AES) is a New Delhi, India-based publishing house that specialises in antiquarian reprints of books that were originally published between the 17th and early 20th centuries. Founded by Jagdish Lall Jetley in 1973, the selection of titles are over 1200 in number.

Involvement

This firm has a very active publication programme that aims to preserve knowledge, in the form of old books, from being lost. An extensive list of about 200 travelogues gives a vivid picture of India specifically, and Asia generally. Many of the big names in Asian exploration and in the field of history have been reprinted. W. W. Hunter, H. H. Wilson, Max Muller, Rhys Davids, H. H. Risley, Edgar Thurston, G. Forrest, G. B. Malleson, Nicholas Greenwood, William Muir, Vincent A. Smith, Emerson Tennent, Wilhelm Geiger, Monier-Willams, Sven Hedin, Richard F. Burton, Francis Younghusband, William Moorcroft, M. Auriel Stein, Marco Polo, Heuin Tsang, Al-Beruni, William of Rubruck, and many more share this shelf space. Travelogues of people who, in the Middle Ages, frequented India such as F. Bernier, J. B. Tavernier, John Fryer, N. Mannuchi, Abbe Carre, J. Ovington, Alexander Hamilton, J. Neuihoff, P. Baldeaus, Father Montserrat, Ippolito Desideri, etc., have been given a new lease on life.

Language aids for over 40 Asian, European and African languages in the form of dictionaries (classical, and popular), Polyglots, grammar aids, and self-taught series are part of the AES programme for language studies. All major languages of the Indian sub-continent have been covered, along with Semitic languages like Amharic and the Arabic family of languages.

Network

Apart from India, other areas of publication activity involve: Sri Lanka, Nepal, Bhutan, Tibet, Himalayas, Central Asia, Burma/Myanmar, the Indian Ocean. Subjects deal with: History, Customs and Manners, Religion, Buddhism, Numismatics, Anthropology, Art, Architecture, Castes and Tribes, The Indian Revolt/Mutiny of 1857, Natural History, gazetteers, guidebooks, etc.

Today

AES was awarded the National Award for Excellence in Publishing in 2005.

AES has been featured regularly in newspapers and TV shows, that highlight its re-publication programme. The newspapers that have carried stories on AES include the national dailies like The Hindu and The Indian Express. Among the channels that have features AES are the National Channel of India (Door Darshan 1) and the CNN/IBN network in India.

After the death of the founder in 2005, the firm is being run by the surviving family.

External links
Official website
Interview with owner by The Hindu

Book publishing companies of India